Nuestra Cocina (English: "Our Kitchen") is a Mexican restaurant in the Hosford-Abernethy neighborhood of southeast Portland, Oregon, in the United States. Benjamin Gonzales and Shannon Dooley-Gonzales are the restaurant's co-owners.

History
Nuestra Cocina opened in 2004.

In 2016, the restaurant starting operating a taco food cart in northwest Portland called Frogtown Tacos.

Reception
In 2013, the restaurant was included in Travel + Leisure list of "Best Mexican Restaurants in the U.S." Similarly,  Nuestra Cocina ranked number 50 on The Daily Meal's 2014 list of "America's 50 Best Mexican Restaurants". Krista Garcia and Seiji Nanbu included the restaurant in Eater Portland's 2022 list of the city's 17 "standout" Mexican restaurants and food carts.

See also

 Hispanics and Latinos in Portland, Oregon
 List of Mexican restaurants

References

External links

 
 
 
 

2004 establishments in Oregon
Hosford-Abernethy, Portland, Oregon
Mexican restaurants in Portland, Oregon
Restaurants established in 2004